Argaeus was king of the ancient Greek kingdom of Macedonia. He was a member of the Argead dynasty and son of Perdiccas I. By allowing thirty years for the span of an average generation from the beginning of Archelaus' reign in 413 BC, British historian Nicholas Hammond estimated that Argaeus ruled around 623 BC.

According to Herodotus and Thucydides, Argaeus was the second king of Macedonia. However, a much later tradition records Caranus as the founder of Macedonia and therefore Argaeus as the fifth king. This unhistorical assertion is almost universally rejected by moderns scholarship as propaganda invented at the Argead court during the reign of Philip II.

According to the 2nd-century AD Greek writer Polyaenus, Argaeus tricked the Illyrian king of the Taulantii, Galaurus, by dressing men as women with wreaths and thyrsi (staffs), closely related to the cult of Dionysus. After the victory, Argaeus founded a temple dedicated to Pseudanor (Fake-man).

References

Notes

Citations

7th-century BC Macedonian monarchs
Argead kings of Macedonia
Mythology of Macedonia (ancient kingdom)
Old Macedonian kingdom
People whose existence is disputed
Year of birth unknown